is the capital city of Tokushima Prefecture on Shikoku island in Japan. , the city had an estimated population of 249,865 in 122085 households and a population density of 1305 persons per km².

Geography
The city is situated in the north-eastern part of Tokushima Prefecture at the mouth of the Yoshino River. In terms of layout and organization, Tokushima displays the typical characteristics of a Japanese castle town. Most of the city is located in the Tokushima plain and is flat, but the symbol of the city, Mt. Bizan, rises in the center, creating a scenic landscape. The southern part is a mountainous area with forests.

Mountains

Rivers
 Akui River
 Imagire River
 Shinmachi River
 Suketō River
 Yoshino River

Neighbouring municipalities 
Tokushima Prefecture
 Komatsushima
 Katsuura
 Matsushige
 Kitajima
 Aizumi
 Ishii
 Kamiyama
 Sanagōchi

Demographics
Per Japanese census data, the population of Tokushima has been growing steadily for the past century.

Climate
Tokushima has a humid subtropical climate (Köppen climate classification Cfa) with hot summers and cool winters. Precipitation is high, but there is a pronounced difference between the wetter summers and drier winters.

History 
As with all of Tokushima Prefecture, the area of Tokushima was part of ancient Awa Province. Tokushima was developed around Tokushima Castle, the seat of the  Hachisuka clan, daimyo of Tokushima Domain under the Edo Period Tokugawa shogunate. Its prosperity was built on a strong indigo dye industry. Following the Meiji restoration, the city of Tokushima was established on October 1, 1889 with the creation of the modern municipalities system. At the time, it was the 10th largest city in Japan.

World War II air raid
Tokushima was selected as a target by the United States' XXI Bomber Command during World War II because of the city's role as an agricultural center for the region. On July 3, 1945, at 5:45 PM (JST) 137 aircraft took off to bomb Tokushima. 1,050 tons of incendiary bombs were dropped on Tokushima, destroying 74% of the built up areas of the city. Over 1000 people were killed in the bombing (431 men, 553 women, 17 of unknown gender) and over 2000 people were injured. The number of incendiary bombs dropped on Tokushima City was enormous at 354,664, and since the population of Tokushima City was 115,508 in 1944, it is calculated that 3.07 incendiary bombs were dropped per citizen.

Government
Tokushima has a mayor-council form of government with a directly elected mayor and a unicameral city council of 30 members. Tokushima contributes ten members to the Tokushima Prefectural Assembly. In terms of national politics, the city is part of Tokushima 1st district of the lower house of the Diet of Japan.

Economy
Tokushima has been the economic center of eastern Shikoku since the Edo period, when prospered as a distribution center for indigo and timber, and was one of the leading commercial cities in Japan. It has a deep connection with the Kansai region especially Osaka, which has become even more prominent in modern times after the opening of the Akashi Kaikyo Bridge. Following the decline of the indigo industry, the accumulated wealth of the merchant class led to the development of banks and financial institutions, which in turn led to modern industries such as spinning, papermaking, pharmaceuticals, food processing and electric power. Although the city area was burnt to the ground due to the Tokushima air raid in World War II, it was quickly reconstructed. There are numerous industrial parks.

Agriculture and forestry both remain as major contributors the local economy. The Tokushima Plain in the Yoshino and Katsuura river basins have fertile agricultural land, and in addition to rice, some items such as cauliflower and carrots are major local products.

Education

Universities and colleges 
 University of Tokushima
 Tokushima Bunri University
 Shikoku University

Primary and secondary education
Tokushima  has 30 public elementary schools and 18 public middle schools operated by the city government and nine public high schools operated by the Tokushima Prefectural Department of Education. There are also one private elementary school, three private middle schools and five private high schools. The prefecture also operates one night school and four special education schools for the disabled.

Transportation

Airport
Tokushima Airport, which is located in neighboring town of Matsushige

Railway
 Shikoku Railway Company – Kōtoku Line 
  -  - 
 Shikoku Railway Company – Mugi Line
  -  -  -  - 
 Shikoku Railway Company – Tokushima Line
  -  -  -

Highways 
  Tokushima Expressway
  Tokushima-Nanbu Expressway

Sister cities 
 Saginaw, Michigan, United States, since December 1961
 Leiria, Portugal, since October 1969
 Dandong, Liaoning, China, since October 1991

Local attrations
Tokushima Castle
Tokushima Castle Museum
Tokushima Archaeological Museum
Tokushima Prefectural Museum
Tokushima Domain Hachisuka clan cemetery, National Historic Site
Dainichi-ji, 13th temple on the Shikoku Pilgrimage
Jōraku-ji, 14th temple on the Shikoku Pilgrimage
Awa Kokubun-ji, 15th temple on the Shikoku Pilgrimage
Kan'on-ji, 16th temple on the Shikoku Pilgrimage
Ido-ji, 17th temple on the Shikoku Pilgrimage
Shibunomaruyama Kofun, National Historic Site
Ichinomiya Jinja, one of the ichinomiya of former Awa Province

Culture
Every August, during the Obon Festival, Tokushima holds a cultural dance festival, the Awa Odori. Awa Odori literally translates as "Awa Dance" (Awa being Tokushima Prefecture's ancient name). During the festival, residents ranging from young children to professional dance troupes perform a distinctive style of Japanese traditional dance in regional costumes, accompanied by strings, drums, and singing (usually by the dancers themselves).

Sports
The city's Asty Tokushima arena hosted the official 2007 Asian Basketball Championship.

Gallery

References

External links

 Tokushima City official website 
 Tokushima City official website 
 
 

Cities in Tokushima Prefecture
Port settlements in Japan
Populated coastal places in Japan
1889 establishments in Japan
Populated places established in 1889